Germán Antonio Gabriel Benaches (born November 16, 1980) is a Spanish retired professional basketball player. He played as a power forward and as a center.

Professional career
Gabriel signed with the Liga ACB club Estudiantes in 2009. After spending four years in the club of Madrid, he signed for Bilbao Basket.

He came back to Unicaja, his first club, in 2015 once he left Bilbao. On December 2, he left Unicaja.

On 4 November 2016, Gabriel announced his retirement from professional basketball.

National team career
After playing with the junior national teams of Spain, Gabriel joined the senior Spain men's national basketball team. He was selected to play with Spain at the EuroBasket 2013.

Career statistics

EuroLeague

|-
| style="text-align:left;"| 2003–04
| style="text-align:left;"| Unicaja
| 14 || 1 || 10.1 || .514 || .556 || .700 || 2.6 || .4 || .4 || .1 || 3.9 || 4.1
|-
| style="text-align:left;"| 2007–08
| style="text-align:left;"| Unicaja
| 18 || 3 || 16.6 || .556 || .491 || .692 || 2.8 || .8 || .7 || .1 || 8.1 || 8.4
|-
| style="text-align:left;"| 2008–09
| style="text-align:left;"| Unicaja
| 6 || 0 || 9.3 || .500 || .467 || 1.000 || 1.5 || .2 || .7 || .0 || 5.7 || 6.0
|-
| style="text-align:left;"| 2014–15
| style="text-align:left;"| Unicaja
| 7 || 0 || 9.0 || .438 || .375 || .714 || 2.0 || .6 || .1 || .1 || 3.1 || 3.4
|- class="sortbottom"
| style="text-align:left;"| Career
| style="text-align:left;"|
| 45 || 4 || 12.4 || .527 || .483 || .704 || 2.5 || .6 || .5 || .1 || 5.7 || 5.9

References

External links
 Germán Gabriel at acb.com 
 Germán Gabriel at eurobasket.com
 Germán Gabriel at euroleague.net
 Germán Gabriel at fiba.com
 Germán Gabriel at fibaeurope.com
 

1980 births
Living people
Baloncesto Málaga players
Bilbao Basket players
CB Estudiantes players
CB Girona players
Centers (basketball)
Club Ourense Baloncesto players
Competitors at the 2005 Mediterranean Games
Iowa Energy coaches
Liga ACB players
Marinos B.B.C. players
Mediterranean Games bronze medalists for Spain
Mediterranean Games medalists in basketball
Power forwards (basketball)
Spanish expatriate basketball people in the United States
Spanish men's basketball players
Sportspeople from Caracas
Venezuelan emigrants to Spain
Venezuelan expatriate basketball people in Spain